Kulathummal  is a village in Thiruvananthapuram district in the state of Kerala, India.

Demographics
 India census, Kulathummal had a population of 37463 with 18419 males and 19044 females.

References

Villages in Thiruvananthapuram district